Whirlpool is the debut studio album by English shoegaze band Chapterhouse. It was released on 29 April 1991 by Dedicated Records.

Release
Whirlpool was released on 29 April 1991 by Dedicated Records. It spent three weeks on the UK Albums Chart, peaking at number 23. "Pearl" was issued as the album's only single on 18 March 1991, reaching number 67 on the UK Singles Chart.

Cherry Red Records reissued Whirlpool in 2006 with several bonus tracks taken from Chapterhouse's EPs Freefall and Sunburst, both released in 1990, and the "Pearl" single. It also included, for the first time, printed lyrics for all of the album's songs.

The initial and subsequent runs of the Cherry Red CD reissue were pressed using a lossy master source for tracks 1 to 9, 13 and 14. The corrected version has the reference TC2159 printed on the inner CD ring. As of 2015, this was still the case, with Cherry Red reported as continuing to send out versions of the CD – now bearing the reference CDMRED304V2 – which were sourced from the lossy master, rather than the DAT, for tracks 1 to 9, 13 and 14.

Critical reception

In 2016, Pitchfork ranked Whirlpool at number 17 on its list of the 50 best shoegaze albums of all time.

Track listing

Personnel
Credits are adapted from the album's liner notes.

Chapterhouse
 Russell Barrett – bass
 Ashley Bates – drums
 Stephen Patman – vocals, guitar
 Simon Rowe – guitar
 Andrew Sherriff – vocals, guitar

Additional musicians
 Rachel Goswell – backing vocals on "Pearl"

Production
 Paul Adkins – recording
 Chapterhouse – production
 John Fryer – mixing
 Robin Guthrie – production on "Something More", additional mixing and production on "Autosleeper"
 Stephen Hague – additional mixing and production on "Falling Down"
 Ralph Jezzard – production on "Breather" and "Pearl"
 Jim Warren – recording

Design
 Albert Tupelo – design

Charts

References

External links
 

1991 debut albums
Chapterhouse albums
Albums produced by Robin Guthrie
Albums produced by Stephen Hague
Dedicated Records albums